Macaduma corvina is a moth of the subfamily Arctiinae. It was described by Felder in 1875. It is found on Fiji.

References

Macaduma
Moths described in 1875